Niyazi Güney (born 26 April 1974) is a Turkish former association football player and coach. During his career, his most notable success was to win Süper Lig title at 2002–03 season, while playing at Beşiktaş J.K.

Honours
Beşiktaş
Süper Lig: 2002–03
 PTT
TFF Third League: 1994–95

References

External links

1974 births
Living people
Turkish footballers
People from Trabzon
Association football midfielders
Süper Lig players
Türk Telekom G.S.K. footballers
Gaziantepspor footballers
Kardemir Karabükspor footballers
MKE Ankaragücü footballers
Beşiktaş J.K. footballers
Konyaspor footballers
Diyarbakırspor footballers
Mardinspor footballers
Uşakspor footballers
Pendikspor footballers